Sciomesa is a genus of moths of the family Noctuidae described by Willie Horace Thomas Tams and J. Bowden in 1953.

Species
 Sciomesa argocyma D. S. Fletcher, 1961
 Sciomesa betschi Viette, 1967
 Sciomesa biluma Nye, 1959
 Sciomesa constantini Laporte, 1984
 Sciomesa cyclophora D. S. Fletcher, 1961
 Sciomesa etchecopari Laporte, 1975
 Sciomesa janthina Viette, 1959
 Sciomesa jemjemensis Laporte, 1984
 Sciomesa mesophaea (Hampson, 1910)
 Sciomesa mesoscia (Hampson, 1918)
 Sciomesa mirifica Laporte, 1984
 Sciomesa nyei D. S. Fletcher, 1961
 Sciomesa oberthueri Viette, 1967
 Sciomesa ochroneura D. S. Fletcher, 1963
 Sciomesa piscator D. S. Fletcher, 1961
 Sciomesa renibifida Berio, 1973
 Sciomesa scotochroa (Hampson, 1914)
 Sciomesa secata Berio, 1977
 Sciomesa sjoestedti (Aurivillius, 1925)
 Sciomesa venata D. S. Fletcher, 1961

References
 
 

Hadeninae